Darko Rakočević (born 13 September 1981) is a Serbian football manager and former professional footballer who played as a defender.

Career
After playing for Borac Čačak in the First League of Serbia and Montenegro, Rakočević moved abroad to Asia and signed for Kitchee in early 2006. He spent one and a half seasons in Hong Kong, before returning to his homeland and rejoining his former club Metalac Gornji Milanovac in the summer of 2007.

In 2008, Rakočević played for Kazakhstan Premier League club Kairat. He returned to Metalac Gornji Milanovac in early 2009, spending there the next two years. In early 2011, Rakočević moved abroad for the third time and joined Thai club Chonburi. He also played for Songkhla United in 2013 and 2014.

References

External links

 
 
 

Association football defenders
Darko Rakocevic
Expatriate footballers in Hong Kong
Expatriate footballers in Kazakhstan
Expatriate footballers in Thailand
FC Kairat players
First League of Serbia and Montenegro players
FK Borac Čačak players
FK Metalac Gornji Milanovac players
FK Mladost Lučani players
FK Polet Ljubić players
FK Remont Čačak players
Hong Kong First Division League players
Kazakhstan Premier League players
Kitchee SC players
People from Gornji Milanovac
Serbia and Montenegro expatriate footballers
Serbia and Montenegro expatriate sportspeople in Hong Kong
Serbia and Montenegro footballers
Serbian expatriate footballers
Serbian expatriate sportspeople in Hong Kong
Serbian expatriate sportspeople in Kazakhstan
Serbian expatriate sportspeople in Thailand
Serbian First League players
Serbian footballers
Serbian SuperLiga players
Darko Rakocevic
Darko Rakocevic
1981 births
Living people